Seedless Clothing is a clothing brand based at Ocean Beach, a neighborhood of San Diego, California. The company was founded in 1992  by Shea McComb (McAdams). It has since become a consulting firm as well for various bands, DJs, and events, most notably the High Times Cannabis Cup, and the Seedless 420 Party.

Seedless 420 Party 
The Seedless 420 Party, inaugurated in 2001, is an annual event that has included performances by entertainers like the Long Beach Dub Allstars (composed of the remaining members of Sublime), RZA, Methodman, Redman, Barrington Levy, Junior Reid, George Clinton, Slightly Stoopid, and Snoop Dogg. In 2008, the Seedless 420 Party featured a Miss Seedless contest, where staff writer Bobby Black of High Times participated as a guest judge. The eventual winner, Gina, went on to become High Times’ Miss September 2008.

High Times Cannabis Cup 
In 2013, Seedless Clothing assisted with the marketing of the first High Times Cannabis Cup to be held in Denver, Colorado. In addition, Seedless Clothing assisted with the marketing for the High Times Cannabis Cup held in Seattle, Washington.

NFL cease and desist 
In 2010, Seedless Clothing designed a t-shirt featuring a lightning bolt with the word "seedless" across the front. The NFL issued a cease and desist to Seedless Clothing to prevent them from selling the t-shirt in which the lightning bolt appeared.   The company ceased production of the t-shirt to avoid litigation.

References

Clothing companies of the United States
Companies based in San Diego
Ocean Beach, San Diego
American companies established in 1992
Clothing companies established in 1992
1992 establishments in California